Sliabh an Iarainn (Irish for "iron mountain"), anglicized Slieve Anierin, is a mountain in County Leitrim, Ireland. Its present form evolved from the southwestward movement of ice age glaciers over millions of years, the morainic drift heaping thousands of drumlins in the surrounding lowlands. Historically there were many iron ore deposits and ironworks in the area. Irish mythology associates the mountain with the Tuatha Dé Danann, particularly the smith god Goibniu. Sliabh an Iarainn is an important natural heritage site with exposed marine and coastal fauna of paleontological interest

Etymology
The name  means "mountain or moor of the iron" and refers to the many iron ore deposits in the area. Boate (1652) said "the mountains are so full of this metal, that hereof it hath got in Irish the name of Slew Neren, that is, Mountains of Iron". It is sometimes anglicized 'Slieve Anierin' or 'Slievanierin'.

The mountain was anciently named , or the "mountain of the Conmaicne Rein in Connacht".

Natural heritage site

Sliabh an Iarainn is an important natural heritage site due to unbroken sequence of Carboniferous marine fossils present in the rock layers spanning the Namurian (326-315 million years ago) and lower Westphalian (313-304 million years ago) stages of the Silesian (series). The Geological survey of Ireland (1878) wrote "".

In her landmark study "The Palaeontology of the Namurian rocks of Slieve Anierin, County Leitrim, Eire", Patricia Yates (1962) demonstrated a "remarkable extent" of Namurian marine fauna bands, abundant with goniatite-Bivalvia, at Sliabh an Iarainn.  She described some rock layers as particularly fossiliferous, the shale bands abundant with goniatite faunas and Bivalvia marine and freshwater molluscs. The unfossiliferous shales often contain numerous clay-ironstone bands making conditions intolerable for marine organisms.  At most of the fossiliferous levels in the Namurian beds the number of goniatites and Bivalvia are usually very high with the diversity of species low. The richest and most diverse band in the succession at Sliabh an Iarainn, in terms of species present, contains Trilobites, brachiopods, gastropods, echinoids and Bryozoa. Fragments of trilobites occur abundantly at particular bands. Overall, Yates documented nearly 120 distinct fossiliferous sites around Sliabh an Iarainn, her work complemented by extensive photographs of often beautifully preserved fossils. Her study of Sliabh an Iarainn is considered important, being housed at the Murchison Museum, Imperial College, British Geological Survey Museum, and the Natural Museum in London.

Geography
Sliabh an Iarainn is an imposing Hill in rural West Ireland, towering over and dominating the rugged landscape.

Geology
Shale is the dominant rock type throughout the Carboniferous succession, but a thick grit, with coal seams, occurs in the lower   rock layers of 326-315 million years ago. At its greatest width the outcrop stretches eastwards towards Swanlinbar  distant. The outcrop narrows northwards, interrupted by a deep shoreline indentation of Carboniferous Limestone around the Belcoo area, to the north of which it widens before rapidly narrowing towards Lough Erne.

Sliabh an Iarainn, at the southern end of this mass, and east of Lough Allen, is a flat topped mountain with a prominent and steep grit slope, easily mistaken for the summit from a distance, when in fact another  of shales form a small residual outlier overlying this grit. There is a thick obscuring mantle of peat bog and glacial drift below the steep grit slope, with heather and peat bog forming a thick mantle over most of the upland plateau at the summit.  Rocks are typically horizontal or gently dipping, except in land-slipped areas.  Impressive landslides have occurred along the western face, and at the south-western and south-eastern corners of the mountain, indicating an appreciative magnitude of land-slipping.

Stratigraphy
The geological section from Lough Allen across Sliabh an Iarainn has the following general succession of strata-

 Yoredale Beds or Namurian base.
 Coarse grits. 
 Shales, limestones, and flags. 
 Shales with ironstone modules 

 Millstone Grit:
 Crow coal with shale layers.  
 Flag Grits  
 Shales 
 Coarse grits  
 Coal seat, with plant remains 
 Middle coal 
 Shales 
 Coarse grits and flagstones 
 Lower coal measures:
 Shales with marine fossils 

The so-called "Yoredale beds" extend down to the edge of Lough Allen on the west, and to the top of the Carboniferous Limestone on the south and south-east. At the base of the succession occur limestones, calcareous mudstones, and sandstones, but from the base of the Namurian upwards shales are continuous until the millstone grit horizon.

Coal field
Sliabh an Iarainn is the most eastern part of the Connacht coal field.  Well-marked escarpment lines are visible, partly exposed by lines of geological fault on all sides of the mountain valleys, the collapsed layers removed by denudation.  The outcrop of two coal seams, crow coals with a sandstone roof and middle coal under a slate roof, are traceable some difficulty along the grit escarpment on the western side of Sliabh an Iarainn towards the Stony River valley, becoming completely obscured by drift deposits on the southern flanks, and on the eastern flanks to a mile North of Lough Nabellbeg continuing through the townlands of Sradrinagh and Cornamucklagh South obscured by a thick blanket of peat bog, becoming visible again further north on the western side of the hill at Cleighran More and Cleighran Beg where faults are evident. The outcrop of both coal seams is also traceable for  along the south-eastern slopes of Bencroy. More than two coal seams may be present at Sliabh an Iarainn, though the only rocks observable over the coal seams (in the millstone grit) are the lower coal measure containing black and brown splintery shales of a considerable thickness at Bencroy to the east and Barnameenagh to the west.

Heritage

Literary project

The Sliabh an Iarainn project is a literary initiative started in 2004 to write about the history of the people who inhabited the necklace of townlands on the flanks of Sliabh-an-Iarainn and Ben Croy, in county Leitrim. The goal was to preserve a memory of the Ultachs, Catholic refugees displaced out of Ulster in 1795 who made a home on the mountain, their experiences of famine and emigration, and the resilience of the remaining communities. This social history was released in three volumes-

 Mountain Echoes, Sliabh an Iarainn's Story (Vol. 1)
 Mountain Shadows, Sliabh an Iarainn's Story (Vol. 2)
 Mountain Roots, Sliabh an Iarainn's Story (Vol. 3)

Ulster Plantation

In the 1609 Plantation of Ulster, Sliabh an Iarainn formed part of lands which were granted to John Sandford of Castle Doe, Co. Donegal (the father-in-law of Thomas Guyllym of Ballyconnell) by letters patent dated 7 July 1613 (Pat. 11 James I – LXXI – 38, Slewenerin). It was later sold by Sandford to his wife's uncle Toby Caulfeild, 1st Baron Caulfeild, Master of the Ordnance and Caulfield had the sale confirmed by letters patent of 12 July 1620 (Pat. 19 James I. XI. 45 Slewnerin).

Muintir-Eolais lake
In the remote mountainous Cuilcagh-Anierin uplands, an oligotrophic lake called "Lough Munter Eolas" is named after Eolais Mac Biobhsach and the Muintir Eolais, the most famous of the Leitrim sub-septs of the Conmaicne Rein). This lake straddles the border of Moneensauran townland in west Cavan and Slievenakilla townland in south Leitrim.

Iron industry
Iron Ore has been dug at Sliabh an Iarainn since the 1600s, the Ore rather tough like Spanish Iron. Commercial Iron works existed around Sliabh an Iarainn , and though nearly all were destroyed during the Irish Rebellion of 1641, they were revived after the Irish Confederate Wars at the earliest, or in the 1690s after the Battle of the Boyne. Many smelting works employed English or other foreigners instead of Irish labour which generated much local hostility. The siting of Smelting works contiguous to Lough Allen allowed for the transportation of Pig Iron in boats of up to forty tons. Commercial iron mining declined after  as deforestation exhausted the fuel for burning charcoal.

Cornashamsoge Furnace

In the 17th century the Cornashamsoge smelting works founded. Local tradition says "".

Sliabh an Iarainn Leat
Local folklore recalls a so-called "Sliabh an Iarainn canal" connected with Cornashamsoge smelting works- "". His description best describes a Leat rather than a canal.

Drumshanbo Furnace
After the ironstone melted, the Pig iron was brought to Drumshanbo Finery forge to the south of Lough Allen to produce the malleable iron product which was transported to Dublin and Limerick by boat. Folklore claims the "". Drumshanbo Iron works closed in 1765.

Ballinamore Iron works
Ballinamore Iron works was established sometime after 1693 and continued production until probably 1747 when the business was put up for sale, the assets including a furnace, forge, slitting mill, mine yards, coal yards, large quantities of pig iron, mine and coals.

Creevlea Iron works
The last Iron works in Ireland, located at Creevelea in county Leitrim, closed around 1770 though they reopened again years later again. Crevelea works ceased production in 1858, and later attempts to revive the industry here complete failures.

Swanlinbar Iron works
There was an Iron works at Swanlinbar in county Cavan right at the far north-east corner of Sliabh an Iarainn, though it had closed by 1785 according to an observer who wrote- "".

Coal industry

Ancient forest
Long ago Ireland had been covered in Woodland, a claim echoed by a 19th century survey of Leitrim- "". These great forests in Leitrim and on the west side of Lough Allen were denuded for the making for Charcoal for Iron works around Sliabh an Iarainn. Immense piles of cleared timber existed at Drumshanbo in 1782.

In mythology

Tuatha De Dannan
The Book of Invasions describes the Tuatha Dé Danann, tribe of the goddess Danu arriving in Mesolithic Ireland through the air before landing their floating-ships on the summit of Sliabh an Iarainn, "".  The men included Nuada the king, Manannan the powerful, Neit the battle god, and Goibniu the Smith. The women included Badb the battle goddess, Eadon the poets nurse, Brigit a goddess, and Dagna the goddess mother. Messengers informed Eochaid son of Ere, and king of the Fir Bolg, that a new race of people had settled in Ireland. The Firbolgs sent forward their champion Sreng and the Tuatha De Danann getting sight of his approach sent their champion Bres. The two champions had a meeting at Magh Rein below Sliabh an Iarainn but no peace was concluded. The Tuatha Dé Danann defeated the Firbolg at Battle of Moytura. Three centuries later the De Danann retreated to the Celtic Otherworld on being displaced by the Milesians, mythological ancestors of the Irish race.

Gobán Saor
Metal workers were held in high esteem, and the Irish Pantheon Gobán Saor is synonymous with the legendary Scandinavian named Vaeland Smith and Goibniu of the Tuatha De Dannan. According to oral tradition, Gobán Saor ("Goibhenen"), Tuatha De Danann metalsmith, worked the mines here.

Ancient aliens
Some fringe historians suggest a passage in the Book of Invasions concerning the appearance of the Tuatha Dé Danann in Ireland, records "" at Sliabh an Iarainn.

Hunger stone
Long ago in the parish of Kiltubrid the term  ("hungry man") was applied to a hunger which supposedly may inflict a person on the mountains, proving fatal if not quickly satisfied. This hunger immediately affected any person who walked on a legendary "" at the base of Sliabh an Iarainn.

Fairies revenge
Oral tradition in Cavan described how a local man, "Turlough the Yellow-haired", asked the mountain fairies to destroy the Swanlinbar Iron works and send the foreigners away, and  "".

In popular culture

Podcasts 

 In the Artifexian Podcast episode 36, one of the hosts, Edgar Grunewald, complains about the unfair description of Sliabh an Iarainn as an imposing "Mountain". He would later comment on the conflict over this description in episode 37 of the podcast

See also 

 List of Marilyns in Ireland.
 List of fossil sites worldwide.

References and notes

Notes

Citations

Sources

External links

Mountains and hills of County Leitrim
Marilyns of Ireland
Paleontological sites of Europe
Geology of Ireland
Carboniferous Europe
Places of Conmaicne Maigh Nissi
Places of Conmaicne Maigh Rein